The 2019–20 season is Adelaide United Women's 12th season in the W-League.

Players

Transfers

Transfers in

Loans in

Transfers out

Loans out

Squad statistics

Appearances and goals

{| class="wikitable sortable plainrowheaders" style="text-align:center"
|-
! rowspan="2" |
! rowspan="2" |
! rowspan="2" style="width:180px;" |Name
! colspan="2" style="width:87px;" |W-League
! colspan="2" style="width:87px;" |Total
|-
|1
|GK
! scope="row" | Sarah Willacy

|0
|0

!0
!0
|-
|2
|DF
! scope="row" | Emily Hodgson

|0
|0

!0
!0
|-
|3
|DF
! scope="row" | Charlotte Grant

|0
|0

!0
!0
|-
|4
|DF
! scope="row" | Georgia Iannella

|0
|0

!0
!0
|-
|6
|DF
! scope="row" | Georgia Campagnale

|0
|0

!0
!0
|-
|7
|FW
! scope="row" | Isabel Hodgson

|0
|0

!0
!0
|-
|8
|MF
! scope="row" | Emily Condon

|0
|0

!0
!0
|-
|10
|MF
! scope="row" | Chelsie Dawber

|0
|0

!0
!0
|-
|11
|DF
! scope="row" | Laura Johns

|0
|0

!0
!0
|-
|14
|MF
! scope="row" | Grace Abbey

|0
|0

!0
!0
|-
|17
|DF
! scope="row" | Kahlia Hogg

|0
|0

!0
!0
|-
|20
|GK
! scope="row" | Sian McLaren

|0
|0

!0
!0
|-
|23
|FW
! scope="row" | Michelle Heyman

|0
|0

!0
!0
|-
|30
|GK
! scope="row" | Evelyn Goldsmith

|0
|0

!0
!0
|-
|—
|MF
! scope="row" | Ciara Fowler

|0
|0

!0
!0
|-
|—
|FW
! scope="row" | Mary Fowler

|0
|0

!0
!0
|-
|—
|FW
! scope="row" | Mallory Weber

|0
|0

!0
!0
|}

Competitions

Overview

{|class="wikitable" style="text-align:left"
|-
!rowspan=2 style="width:140px;"|Competition
!colspan=8|Record
|-
!style="width:40px;"|
!style="width:40px;"|
!style="width:40px;"|
!style="width:40px;"|
!style="width:40px;"|
!style="width:40px;"|
!style="width:40px;"|
!style="width:70px;"|
|-
|W-League

|-
!Total

W-League

League table

Results by round

Matches

References

Adelaide United FC (A-League Women) seasons